The Darwin Football Association is an Australian rules football league in Tasmania. The clubs belonging to the association are from localities close to Burnie and on the West Coast of Tasmania. This includes Queenstown, making this competition the only competition in Australia to play some of its games on a gravel surface.

History
The current form of the Darwin Football Association (DFA) was created in 1951. A previous version existed from 1938 to 1944 but appears unrelated despite two of the DFA's foundation clubs being in the competition. The first season featured just four clubs: Yeoman, Tewkesbury, APPM and Montello. Yeoman and APPM were previously members of the North West Football Union and Tewkesbury a member of the Ridgley Football Association. But in 1952 the numbers increased by three with the inclusion of Somerset, Mooreville and Ridgley. The arrival of Myalla and Yolla in 1953 increased the number again to eight clubs combined with the departure of Tewkesbury.

In 1955 the number of clubs dropped back to six with Montello and Somerset departing, and then following season APPM changed their name to South Burnie. In 1959 Mooreville had merged with Somerset to form the Cam FC as the competition remained more or less stable.

In 1965 the folding of the Riana Football Association brought Natone and Cuprona to the competition. This brought the competition up to eight clubs, and has never dropped below that number since. Another period of stability followed with only Cam reverting to Somerset FC in 1973 to create any ripples.

In 1982 the competition expanded to ten clubs with the inclusion of Sprent and West Ulverstone from the Leven Football Association. The DFA introduced a final five in 1986. In 1994, Queenstown "Crows"—a merger of the Queenstown-based clubs from the Western Tasmanian Football Association—joined the competition.

Numbers started to fall in 1996 when Sprent departed for the North Western Football Association, and then the following season South Burnie decided to try their luck in the Northern Tasmanian Football League, but they returned in 1999. In 2002 West Ulverstone followed Sprent to the North West Football Association, and in 2006 after many years in existence Myalla folded bringing the number of clubs back to eight for the first time since 1981.

Due to a shortage of players Natone went into recess for the 2019 season. Due to the COVID-19 Pandemic during 2020, the complete 2020 DFA Season was cancelled. Natone have re-joined the league for the 2021 season.

Premiers

1951 Yeoman
1952 Yeoman
1953 Montello
1954 APPM
1955 Ridgley
1956 Ridgley
1957 Myalla
1958 Myalla
1959 South Burnie
1960 Cam
1961 Cam
1962 South Burnie
1963 Cam
1964 Ridgley
1965 Ridgley
1966 Ridgley
1967 South Burnie
1968 South Burnie
1969 Ridgley
1970 Ridgley
1971 Ridgley

1972 Cam
1973 Natone
1974 Myalla
1975 Myalla
1976 Myalla
1977 Cuprona
1978 Yeoman
1979 Yolla
1980 Yolla
1981 Yolla
1982 Somerset
1983 Yolla
1984 Yolla
1985 West Ulverstone
1986 Yolla
1987 Yolla
1988 Yolla
1989 Ridgley
1990 Natone
1991 Yolla
1992 Yolla

1993 Yeoman
1994 South Burnie
1995 South Burnie
1996 Natone
1997 Queenstown
1998 Yeoman
1999 Natone
2000 Cuprona
2001 Natone
2002 Natone
2003 Myalla
2004 South Burnie
2005 Yolla
2006 Yolla
2007 Ridgley
2008 Ridgley
2009 Ridgley
2010 Somerset
2011 Natone
2012 South Burnie
2013 South Burnie

2014 Queenstown
2015 South Burnie
2016 South Burnie
2017 South Burnie
2018 South Burnie
2019 Somerset
2020 Season cancelled (Covid-19)
2021 Queenstown
2022 Yolla

Clubs

Former Clubs

2009 Ladder

2010 Ladder

2011 Ladder

2012 Ladder

2013 Ladder

2014 Ladder

See also
Queenstown Oval, Tasmania

Footnotes

Further reading

External links
 Darwin Football Association official website 
 DFA scores repository
 Football Tasmania list of associations

Australian rules football competitions in Tasmania
North West Tasmania
Western Tasmania